Omnia is a self-described "neoceltic pagan folk" band based in the Netherlands, whose members over the years have had Irish, Dutch, Cornish, Belgian, Indonesian, and Persian backgrounds. Their music takes the form of various cultural routes, from places such as Ireland, England, Cornwall, and Iran. The name of the band is a Latin word that means "everything". 

They sing in English, French, Breton, Finnish, German, Dutch, Swedish, Latin, and Hindi, and play Celtic harp, mouth harp, hurdy-gurdy, bodhrán, guitar, bouzouki, didgeridoo, flutes of all kinds, bagpipes, various drums and percussion instruments.

Band line-up

Present band line-up 
Steve "Sic" Evans van der Harten (lead vocals, double flute, overtone flute, whistle, bouzouki, darbukka, dombek, davul, mouth harp)
Jennifer "Jenny" Evans van der Harten (lead vocals, Celtic tall harp, piano, hurdy-gurdy, bodhrán, hammered dulcimer)
Daphyd "Crow" Sens (triple-slide didgeridoo, mouth harp, vocals).

Prior band members 
Rob "Raido" van Barschot (drums and percussion)
Satria Karsono (acoustic guitar and backing vocals)
Luka Aubri-Krieger (didgeridoo and backing vocals)

Discography

Studio albums 

 Sine Missione (recorded 1999, released 2000, no label)
 Sine Missione II (2002, Emmuty records)
 OMNIA "3" (2003, Zap Prod.) 
 Crone of War (2004, Zap Prod.) — An album that focuses on Celtic mythology, such as the Mabon festival and gods such as Cernunnos and Taranis.
 PaganFolk (2006, PaganScum records) — An album with numerous traditional instruments employed. The style has been compared to the music of the German band Faun.
Alive! (2007 PaganScum records). — The witches scene from Shakespeare's Macbeth, "The Raven" by Edgar Allan Poe and a poem by Lewis Carroll were set to music on this release. The artwork was created together with Alan Lee.
Wolf Love (2010, PaganScum records)  — Contains all the different music styles OMNIA is capable of. Includes a free DVD of live material of the 2010 line-up . "Jabberwocky" by Lewis Carroll was set to music on this release.
Musick and Poëtree (2011, PaganScum records) — a two-disc CD with one recorded with members of the 2011 line-up and the other recorded by Stenny, solo. Notable songs are Free and a cover of the classic Wim Sonneveld song Het dorp about the modernisation of rural life in the Netherlands, which is sung by Steve Sic in Dutch, the first ever Dutch language song by OMNIA.
Earth Warrior (2014)
Naked Harp (2015) Jenny's solo album.
Prayer (2016)
Reflexions (2018)

Live albums 
Live Religion (2005, PaganScum records) — Live album recorded in a church with one microphone.
PaganFolk At The Fairy Ball (2008, PaganScum records) — A live album downloadable for free from the official website
Live on Earth (2012)

Compilations and remixes 
Cybershaman (2007, PaganScum records) — A remix album featuring eight Omnia songs in Trance music and Electronic style.
History (2007, PaganScum records) (American sampler) — Compilation album specifically made and remastered for United States sales.
World Of Omnia (2009, PaganScum records) — Partly a re-mastered compilation of older OMNIA works together with reworked new recordings and two original tracks.

DVD 
Pagan Folk Lore (2008, PaganScum records) — live DVD containing interviews and performances of the 2008 line-up

Links related to songs performed by Omnia 
 An Dro
 Lughnasadh
 Morrígan
 Odi et Amo
 Teutates
 "Twa Corbiez" (a version of The Three Ravens)
 "Dúlamán"
 Bealtaine

See also
 Music of the Netherlands
 Music of Cornwall
 Paganism
 Celtic Neopaganism
 Pagan rock

References

External links 

  (WebCite archive)

Neofolk music groups
Pagan-folk musicians
Cornish folk music
Dutch folk music groups
Musical groups established in 1996